Jennifer L. Lawless (born March 12, 1975) serves as the Commonwealth Professor of Politics of the University of Virginia and a faculty affiliate of the Frank Batten School of Leadership and Public Policy, in addition to being a Non-Resident Senior Fellow in Governance Studies at the Brookings Institution.

Education 
Her father John, a Catholic and Wall Street broker for Dean Witter from 1961 - 1995, who commuted daily to NYC from upstate NY. Her mother, Marjorie Mensch was a Brooklyn born Jew and executive director of Middletown (NY) housing authority. Jen graduated Valedictorian of Middletown high school in 1993, in Orange county, New York. She turned down a full scholarship to Columbia University to attend Union College, where she received her B.A. from in 1997 and her Ph.D. from Stanford University in 2003; both degrees were in political science. Her doctoral dissertation was entitled "Women and Elections: Do They Run? Do They Win? Does it Matter?" Lawless was hired as an Assistant Professor of Political Science and Public Policy at Brown University from July 2003 to June 2009, and was shortly an Associate Professor from July to August 2009. 
She then joined the American University faculty in September 2009 as an Associate Professor of Government and Director of the Women & Politics Institute. Lawless later became a full Professor in June 2013, and in April 2014 she became a Non-Resident Senior Fellow in Governance Studies at the Brookings Institution. In August 2018 Lawless left American University to become the Commonwealth Professor of Politics at the University of Virginia and a faculty affiliate of the Frank Batten School of Leadership and Public Policy.

Career 
The central focuses of Lawless’s courses and research are women and politics, campaigns, and elections. Courses she has taught at American University include: "Women & Politics," "Women & Political Leadership," and "Women, Politics & Public Policy." Her research regarding female candidates and election results is published in a number of political science journals, including American Journal of Political Science, Perspectives on Politics, Political Research Quarterly, Legislative Studies Quarterly, The Journal of Politics, Politics & Gender, and Women & Politics. News outlets regularly quote this scholarship, particularly during campaign season. Her commentary has appeared in newspapers such as, the New York Times, the Wall Street Journal, USA Today and other local publications. She has also been cited onCNN.com, MSNBC.com, and FOXNews.com and has published on CNN Opinion on CNN.com.

With Richard L. Fox, Lawless is the co-author of three books: "It Takes A Candidate: Why Women Don't Run for Office". "It Still Takes A Candidate: Why Women Don't Run for Office" and "Running from Office: Why Young Americans Are Turned Off to Politics". She is also the author of "Becoming a Candidate:  Political Ambition and the Decision to Run for Office", and of multiple Brookings Institution reports, which Emerge America, the Women’s Campaign Forum, and other women’s organizations that recruit female political candidates frequently utilize for their own work.

Electoral history
In 2006, Lawless ran for the U.S. House of Representatives in the Democratic Primary in Rhode Island's 2nd congressional district.  She did not win the primary and has not run in another election. Through her work at the Women & Politics Institute and her position as a board member of Emerge America she remains active in the political arena.

Bibliography
Books
 
  Details.
  Details. 
  Details.
 

Journal articles
 
  Pdf.
 
  Pdf.
 
  Pdf.
 
 
 
 
 
 
  Pdf.
  Pdf.
  Pdf.
 
  Pdf.
  Pdf.
  Pdf.
  Pdf.
 

Papers
 
  Pdf.

Filmography

 The documentary lists the center as the "Women in Politics Institute"

References

External links
 AU Profile of Jennifer L. Lawless
 Women & Politics Institute homepage
 American University homepage
 Lawless on CNN Opinion
 

Women in Rhode Island politics
Living people
Union College (New York) alumni
Stanford University alumni
American University faculty and staff
Brown University faculty
1975 births
American women academics
21st-century American women